The Columbia University Indo-Iranian Series is a 13-volume book series edited by A. V. Williams Jackson and published by the Columbia University Press between 1901 and 1932.

Volumes

See also
Harvard Oriental Series
Loeb Classical Library
Murty Classical Library of India
The Mythology of All Races
Columbia University Biological Series

References

Columbia University Press books
Series of books